Khanewal, is a subdivision (tehsil) of Khanewal District in the Punjab province of Pakistan. It is administratively subdivided into 25 Union Councils, six of which form the tehsil capital Khanewal.

Administration
The tehsil of Khanewal  is administratively subdivided into 25  Union Councils, these are:
  Pirrowal
   chak no 14 Batian Wala
   Chak No. 12/AH
   Chak No. 171/10-R
   chak no 67.10R Batian Wala
   chak no 18.AH
   Chak No. 4/AH
   Chak No. 30/10.R
   Chak No. 36/10.R
   Chak No. 43/10-R
   Chak No. 58/10-R( Chak Shahana )
   Chak No. 70/10-R
   Chak No. 76/10-R
   Chak No. 80/10-R
   Chak No. 81-82/10-R
   Chak No. 88/10-R
   Chak No. 92/10-R
  Khanewal Kohna
  Khanewal-I
  Khanewal-II
  Khanewal-III
  Khanewal-IV
  Khanewal-V
  Khanewal-VI
  Chak no. 34/10-R
 Chak No 7/v ( Basti Sukhera)

Language
Punjabi is the predominant language. Haryanvi, Saraiki and Urdu are also widely spoken in the tehsil.

References

Khanewal District
Tehsils of Punjab, Pakistan